Nils Johan Andersson (20 February 1821 Gärdserum, Småland, Sweden – 27 March 1880 Stockholm), was a Swedish botanist and traveller.  He studied at Uppsala University between 1840-45 obtaining a DSc. On 30 September 1851 he accompanied the Swedish expedition as botanist aboard the frigate , sailing from Karlskrona under the command of Captain Christian Adolf Virgin (1797-1870), on the first Swedish circumnavigation, calling at Honolulu, Tahiti, San Francisco, Sydney and Manila, various South American ports, the Galapagos, Hong Kong and Singapore. On this voyage he collected at the Cape of Good Hope in April 1853. Returning to Sweden, he was appointed Professor of Botany at Lund University. He was also director of the Botanical Department of the Swedish Museum of Natural History and the Hortus Bergianus in Stockholm. His special interests were Salix, Cyperaceae and Gramineae and he published numerous papers on the systematics and morphology of these taxa.

In 1875, acting on behalf of the Swedish Museum of Natural History, he acquired Sonder's South African collection of some 100 000 specimens.

Andersson was commemorated in the Piperaceae genus Anderssoniopiper. According to Yuncker, Trelease's student who completed Trelease's work after his death, there are grave doubts about the type locality of Anderssoniopiper panamense. (presently filed under Piper latifolium L.f.), which is not to be found anywhere in Panama. It may well have been collected in Tahiti, Honolulu or Sydney and mislabelled during or after the voyage.

He was elected a member of the Royal Swedish Academy of Sciences in 1859.

Family
Andersson was married to the artist Anna Tigerhielm. Their son Johan Axel Gustaf Acke (1859-1924) was a well-known painter, sculptor and illustrator.

Some works
Enumeratio Plantarum in Insulis Galapagensibus huiusque Observatorum - Nils Johan Andersson (1861)
En verldsomsegling Stockholm 1853-1854, 3 vols, Leipzig 1854
Salices Lapponiæ Uppsala 1845
Conspectus vegetationis Lapponiae ca. 1846
Atlas öfver Skandinaviska florans naturliqa familjer 1849
Cyperaceae Scandinaviae Stockholm 1849
Gramineae Scandinavae Stockholm 1852
Om Galapagos-Öernas Vegetation Stockholm 1854
Inledning till Botaniken Stockholm 1851-53, 3 tomos
Väggtaflor för åskådnings-undervisningen i Botanik 1861 - 1862

See also
 European and American voyages of scientific exploration

References

Bibliography
Skogman, Carl Johan Alfred - "Fregatten Eugenies Resa Omkring Jorden"... Stockholm, Adolf Bonnier, 1854

Botanists with author abbreviations
Swedish botanists
Members of the Royal Swedish Academy of Sciences
1821 births
1880 deaths